Ale Kino! International Young Audience Film Festival is an international movie event held in Poznań in Poland since 1969. The festival focuses on more ambitious cinema addressed to children and young people. The main organizer of the festival is Children's Art Center in Poznań.

History
The festival's roots go back to local reviews of animation and children's films organised in Poznań since 1963. In 1969  it became a national and soon an international children's cinema and television competition, held every two years (later, every four years) during winter holidays for schools. A theme song in the 1980s was "Czekamy na filmy" sung by children band from Poznań; Łejery.

It became formally a festival in 1994; since 1995 under the auspices of International Centre of Films for Children and Young People.

Until 2005 it took place in June. In 2006 it was moved to December and has been held then ever since.

The festival is divided in two sections: national and international. The movies are judged by a professional jury, children's jury and youths' jury in different categories (feature movies and short movies; for children and youths). Each of them assigning separate awards.

Since 2002 a non-competitive part, of an informative character is held, as well.

Since 2015, the Festival has been accompanied by AleKinomaniacs - characters created by Jan Kallwejt.

Awards
 Professional Jury
 Golden Poznan Goats
 Silver Poznan Goats
 Platinum Poznan Goats 
 European Children's Film Association Award
 Polish Filmmakers Association Award
 Youths' Jury
 Marcin Award
 Children's Jury
 Marcinek Award
 other:
 Teachers' Award
 Audience Award
 Honorable Mentions
 Soccer Goats
and other occasional.

Golden Poznan Goats is the main festival award given to the best feature movies and short movies, in both cases separately for children's and youth's movies. In some years feature movies are divided into two additional categories – actor movies and animation movies. Occasionally Silver Poznan Goats, meaning "second place" and Bronze Poznan Goats or Poznan Goats, as the third, were admitted. In earlier years the awards were given in national and international competition, as well as in specific categories, like best actor, best music and others. Judges deciding on the winners are professional filmmakers from all over the world. Platinum Poznan Goats is awarded to the people who had a special contribution into children's media and filmography.

Marcin and Marcinek are awards admitted by young viewers to the best feature and short movies. The judges are student of Poznań schools. Marcin are admitted by the youth, while Marcinek by children.

Assignments

Golden Poznan Goats for Best Children's Feature Movie

Golden Poznan Goats for Best Youths' Feature Movie

Golden Poznan Goats for Best Feature Movie

Golden Poznan Goats for Best International Feature Movie

See also
Poznań Goats

References

External links
 Ale Kino! International Young Audience Film Festival Official Homepage
 Ale Kino! at the Internet Movie Database
 Ale Kino! YouTube Channel
 Ale Kino! Facebook Channel

Ale Kino! Festival
Film festivals in Poland